Nao Hibino and Miyu Kato were the defending champions but chose to compete with different partners. Kato partnered alongside Asia Muhammad and successfully defended her title, defeating Tímea Babos and Angela Kulikov in the final, 6–3, 7–5.

Hibino partnered alongside Oksana Kalashnikova, but lost in the semifinals to Kato and Muhammad.

Seeds

Draw

Draw

References

External Links
Main Draw

Odlum Brown Vancouver Open - Doubles
2022 Women's Doubles